In mathematics, the Duistermaat–Heckman formula, due to , states that the 
pushforward of the canonical (Liouville) measure on a symplectic manifold under the moment map is a piecewise polynomial measure. Equivalently, the Fourier transform of the canonical measure is given exactly by the stationary phase approximation.

 and, independently,   showed how to deduce the Duistermaat–Heckman formula from a localization theorem for equivariant cohomology.

References

External links 
http://terrytao.wordpress.com/2013/02/08/the-harish-chandra-itzykson-zuber-integral-formula/

Symplectic geometry